In the mathematics of convergent and divergent series, Euler summation is a summation method. That is, it is a method for assigning a value to a series, different from the conventional method of taking limits of partial sums. Given a series Σan, if its Euler transform converges to a sum, then that sum is called the Euler sum of the original series. As well as being used to define values for divergent series, Euler summation can be used to speed the convergence of series.

Euler summation can be generalized into a family of methods denoted (E, q), where q ≥ 0. The (E, 1) sum is the ordinary Euler sum. All of these methods are strictly weaker than Borel summation; for q > 0 they are incomparable with Abel summation.

Definition
For some value y we may define the Euler sum (if it converges for that value of y) corresponding to a particular formal summation as:

If all the formal sums actually converge, the Euler sum will equal the left hand side. However, using Euler summation can accelerate the convergence (this is especially useful for alternating series); sometimes it can also give a useful meaning to divergent sums.

To justify the approach notice that for interchanged sum, Euler's summation reduces to the initial series, because

This method itself cannot be improved by iterated application, as

Examples

 Using y = 1 for the formal sum  we get  if Pk is a polynomial of degree k.
 The particular choice  provides an explicit representation of the Bernoulli numbers, since  (the Riemann zeta function). Indeed, the formal sum in this case diverges since k is positive, but applying Euler summation to the zeta function (or rather, to the related Dirichlet eta function) yields (cf. Globally convergent series)  which is of closed form.
 

See also
 Binomial transform
 Borel summation
 Cesàro summation
 Lambert summation
 Perron's formula
 Abelian and Tauberian theorems
 Abel–Plana formula
 Abel's summation formula
 Van Wijngaarden transformation
 Euler–Boole summation

References

Mathematical series
Summability methods